Effiduase may refer to 
Effiduase a town in the Ashanti Region
Koforidua-Effiduase a town in the Eastern Region of Ghana